Arthur Ernest Nickless (18 March 1879 – 12 March 1915) was an Australian rules footballer who played for the South Melbourne Football Club in the Victorian Football League (VFL).

Notes

External links 

1879 births
1915 deaths
Australian rules footballers from Victoria (Australia)
Sydney Swans players